The Independent Spirit Award for Best International Film is an award presented annually at the Independent Spirit Awards to recognize the best feature films produced outside United States. It was first presented in 1986, with Brazilian-American drama Kiss of the Spider Woman being the first recipient of the award.

Winners and nominees

1980s

1990s

2000s

2010s

2020s

References

F
Film awards for Best Foreign Language Film